A list of rowing boat manufacturers that build for the world's rowing community.

Racing
 Ave Rowing Boats
 BBG
 Black Pearl Composites
 Burton Water Sports
 Carl Douglas Racing Shells
 Cucchietti
 Empacher
 Filippi Boats
 Fluidesign
 George Sharrow Racing Shells no longer in business
 Hudson Boatworks
 Janousek Racing Boats
 John Waugh Racing Boats
 Laszlo Boats NZ
 Levator Boatworks
 Liangjin Boat
 Kaschper Racing Shells
 Kanghua
 King Racing Shells
 Kiwi International Rowing Skiffs (KIRS)
 Maas Rowing Shells
 Nelo Rowing
 Peinert
 Pocock Racing Shells
 Race 1 Australia
 Resolute Racing Shells
Roseman
Rowing Sport Boats (RS boats)
 Salani
Schellenbacher
 SL Racing
 Stämpfli Racing Boats
Swastik Boats
 Swift Racing
 Sykes Racing
 Van Dusen
 Vega
 Vespoli
 Vicente Dors
 WinTech Racing 
 Falcon racing

Recreational
The following are the most commonly used recreational sliding seat shell manufacturers in current use:

Baumgarten Bootsbau
C-Line
 Echo Rowing
 Edon TS515 Sculling Boats
 Euro Diffusions
 Gig Harbor Boat Works
 Leo Coastal Rowing
 LiteBoat
 Little River Marine
 Maas Boat
 Peinert Boat
 Race 1 Australia (wavecutter)
Rowing Sport Boats (RS boats)
 Virus
Volans
 Whitehall Rowing
 Roeiwerf Wiersma

Former manufacturers
These manufacturers formerly built rowing boats but have now ceased production.

 Aylings later became Lola Aylings 
 Burgashell
 Colley
 Carbocraft
 Dirigo
 Drew Harrison Racing
 Edwin Phelps (Putney, London, UK)
 Eton Racing Boats (ERB)
 Flying Dragon Boat Co (Huangzhou, China)
 Harris Racing Boats, formerly George Harris Racing Boats (Iffley, Oxford, UK) 
 Hi-Tech
 Lola Aylings 
 Karlisch 
 Owen
 Pirsch (Friedrich Pirsch Bootswerft, Berlin-Spandau, Germany) 
 Radley
 Salter Bros
 Helmut Schoenbrod (Orange, Connecticut, USA)
 Ray Sims, Eric Sims, et al.
 J Sutton 
 Worcester Oar & Paddle (Joe Garafolo)

See also
Racing shell

References

Boat manufacturers
Rowing equipment manufacturers